Match de prestidigitation (literally "conjuring contest"), released in the United States as A Wager Between Two Magicians, or Jealous of Myself, and in the United Kingdom as A Juggling Contest Between Two Magicians, is a 1904 French short silent film directed by French film pioneer Georges Méliès.

The film was a lost film until partially rediscovered in 2016.

Plot
A performing magician divides into two people. The doubles then take turns doing tricks before merging back into one man.

Cast
Méliès himself plays the magician in the film.

Release and rediscovery
A Wager Between Two Magicians was released by Méliès's Star Film Company and is numbered 542–544 in its catalogues. It was assumed lost until 2016, when a reel containing the final two thirds of the film was discovered at the Czech Film Archive.

References

External links

Films directed by Georges Méliès
1904 films
French silent short films
1900s rediscovered films
French black-and-white films
Rediscovered French films
1900s French films